Néstor Ariel García Rivero (born July 6, 1975) is a male marathon runner from Uruguay.

Garcia won the 2000 edition of the Buenos Aires Marathon in Argentina. He also represented his native country in the men's marathon at the 2000 Summer Olympics in Sydney, Australia.

García is the national record holder in the classic distance with 2:12:48, ran on October 24, 1999 at the Chicago Marathon.

Achievements

External links

 
 Profile at the ARRS

1975 births
Living people
Athletes (track and field) at the 2000 Summer Olympics
Athletes (track and field) at the 1999 Pan American Games
Uruguayan male long-distance runners
Olympic athletes of Uruguay
Pan American Games competitors for Uruguay
Uruguayan people of Spanish descent
Place of birth missing (living people)
Uruguayan male marathon runners